Martin Rymarenko (born 9 April 1999) is a Slovak footballer who plays for Dukla Banská Bystrica, as a forward, on loan from DAC Dunajská Streda.

Club career

DAC Dunajská Streda
Rymarenko made his Fortuna Liga debut for DAC against MFK Zemplín Michalovce on 25 July 2021. He came on to the pitch in the first half as a replacent for Brahim Moumou.

Ružomberok
On 6 September 2021, Rymarenko signed a one-year loan contract with Ružomberok. He was welcomed as a promising player with the aim of improving the offence of Liptáci.

References

External links
 FC DAC 1904 Dunajská Streda official club profile
 Futbalnet profile
 
 

1999 births
Living people
Sportspeople from Banská Bystrica
Slovak footballers
Slovakia youth international footballers
Association football forwards
FC DAC 1904 Dunajská Streda players
KFC Komárno players
FC ŠTK 1914 Šamorín players
MFK Ružomberok players
MFK Dukla Banská Bystrica players
Slovak Super Liga players
2. Liga (Slovakia) players